Ji Jeong-mi (born 4 March 1963) is a South Korean athlete. She competed in the women's heptathlon at the 1988 Summer Olympics.

References

1963 births
Living people
Athletes (track and field) at the 1988 Summer Olympics
South Korean heptathletes
Olympic athletes of South Korea
Place of birth missing (living people)
Asian Games medalists in athletics (track and field)
Asian Games bronze medalists for South Korea
Athletes (track and field) at the 1986 Asian Games
Medalists at the 1986 Asian Games